Aleksandr Danilin (20 June 1961 – 26 January 2019) was a Soviet speed skater. He competed in the men's 500 metres event at the 1984 Winter Olympics.

References

External links
 

1961 births
2019 deaths
Soviet male speed skaters
Olympic speed skaters of the Soviet Union
Speed skaters at the 1984 Winter Olympics
Speed skaters from Moscow